Apistogramma barlowi is a species of dwarf cichlid in the Geophagini tribe of the subfamily Cichlinae, the American cichlids. It is found in forest streams northwest of Pebas town in northern Peru. It was first discovered in Peru in 2000 and scientifically described in 2008.
There are two forms which occur in separate parts of its range: a red form that is darker and has red marks on the head, and a white form that is paler. The specific name is in honor of the ichthyologist George W. Barlow.

The fish has previously been known under the trade name Apistogramma sp. "mouthbrooder", "Maulbrüter" or "Brustband".

Spawning
This species is a facultative, biparental larvophilous mouthbrooder, which is unusual in the genus Apistogramma. Like other members of the genus, they spawn in caves. After the fry have hatched, the female and/or male keeps them in their mouth until they are free-swimming. This species may also keep the eggs and young fry in a shallow pit throughout the brood care process, thus bypassing a mouthbrooding phase. Males are more likely to exclusively mouthbrood the fry when strong water currents are present.

Habitat
Apistogramma barlowi prefers relatively cool and clear fast-flowing forest streams with an acidic to neutral pH.

References

barlowi
Freshwater fish of Peru
Taxa named by Uwe Römer (ichthyologist)
Taxa named by Ingo J. Hahn
Fish described in 2008